Rissana Janoubia is a small town and rural commune in Larache Province of the Tanger-Tetouan-Al Hoceima region of Morocco. At the time of the 2004 census, the commune had a total population of 15,890 people living in 2,592 households.

References

Populated places in Larache Province
Rural communes of Tanger-Tetouan-Al Hoceima